Drive XV: A Tribute to Automatic for the People is a digital compilation released in 2007 by the website Stereogum.com to celebrate the 15th anniversary of R.E.M.'s multi-platinum album Automatic for the People.

Track listing

See also
Surprise Your Pig: A Tribute to R.E.M.

External links
Download from Stereogum

2007 compilation albums
R.E.M. tribute albums
Albums free for download by copyright owner